In databases and transaction processing the term Locks with ordered sharing comprises several variants of the two-phase locking (2PL) concurrency control protocol generated by changing the blocking semantics of locks upon conflicts. One variant is identical to strict commitment ordering (SCO).

References
 D. Agrawal, A. El Abbadi, A. E. Lang: The Performance of Protocols Based on Locks with Ordered Sharing, IEEE Transactions on Knowledge and Data Engineering, Volume 6, Issue 5, October 1994, pp. 805–818, 

Data management
Databases
Concurrency control
Transaction processing